Castilleja arachnoidea is a species of Indian paintbrush known by the common name cobwebby Indian paintbrush.

It is native to northern California and Nevada and southern Oregon, where it is a resident of the local mountain ranges and the Modoc Plateau. This is a small woolly perennial herb growing up to about 30 centimeters in maximum height. Its narrow, pointed leaves are a few centimeters long and may be lobed. The inflorescence is coated in cobwebby fibers. The bracts are yellowish to dull red and the pouchlike flowers which emerge between them are greenish yellow to purplish red in color. The fruit is a capsule about a centimeter long.

References

External links
Jepson Manual Treatment
Photo gallery

arachnoidea
Flora of California
Flora of Nevada
Flora of Oregon